Gmina Strzelce Opolskie is an urban-rural gmina (administrative district) in Strzelce County, Opole Voivodeship, in south-western Poland.

The gmina contains part of the protected area called Góra Świętej Anny Landscape Park.

Villages
Apart from the town of Strzelce Opolskie, Gmina Strzelce Opolskie contains the villages and settlements of Adamowice, Banatki Duże, Banatki Małe, Błotnica Strzelecka, Breguła, Brzezina, Dołki, Doryszów, Dziewkowice, Farska Kolonia, Grodzisko, Jędrynie, Kadłub, Kadłubski Piec, Kalinowice, Kasztal, Ligota Dolna, Ligota Górna, Mokre Łany, Niwki, Nowa Wieś, Osiek, Płużnica Wielka, Rozmierka, Rozmierz, Rożniątów, Sucha, Suche Łany, Szczepanek, Szymiszów and Warmątowice.

Neighbouring gminas
Gmina Strzelce Opolskie is bordered by the gminas of Gogolin, Izbicko, Jemielnica, Kolonowskie, Leśnica, Ozimek, Toszek, Ujazd, Wielowieś and Zdzieszowice.

Twin towns – sister cities

Gmina Strzelce Opolskie is twinned with:

 Bandera, United States
 Druskininkai, Lithuania
 Holice, Czech Republic
 Soest, Germany
 Tysmenytsia, Ukraine

Gallery

References

Strzelce Opolskie